Mukul is an Indian/South-Asian given name, which means "blossoming".

Mukul may refer to:

Given name
Mukul Sharma, Sydney based hotelier, hospitality professional
Mukul Chadda, Indian actor 
Mukul Chowdhury, Bangladeshi lyricist and musical artist 
Mukul Deora, Indian film producer, musician, conceptual artist and entrepreneur
Mukul Dev, Indian artist, actor in films, TV serials and in music albums
Mukul Deva, Indian English author
Mukul Dey, Bengali-Indian artist and pioneer of drypoint-etching in India
Mukul Kesavan, Indian writer and essayist
Mukul Roy, Bengali-Indian politician and member of Parliament
Mukul Sangma, Indian politician
Mukul Shivputra, Indian classical vocalist 
Mukul Wasnik, Indian politician and minister

Family name
M. R. Akhtar Mukul, Bengali author and journalist

Others
Mukul Niketon School, a private school in Mymensingh District, Dhaka, Bangladesh